Bandiagara Cercle is an administrative subdivision of the Mopti Region of Mali. The administrative center (chef-lieu) is the town of Bandiagara.

The cercle is divided into these communes:

Bandiagara
Bara Sara
Borko
Dandoli
Diamnati
Dogani Béré
Doucoumbo 
Dourou
Kendé
Kendié
Lougourougoumbou
Lowol Guéou
Métoumou
Ondougou
Pelou
Pignari
Pignari Bana
Sangha
Ségué-Iré
Soroly
Timniri
Wadouba

References

Cercles of Mali
Mopti Region